Trail is a city in Polk County, Minnesota, United States. It is part of the Grand Forks, ND-MN Metropolitan Statistical Area. The population was 40 at the 2020 census.

History
A post office called Trail has been in operation since 1910. An Indian trail passed near the original town site, hence the name Trail.

Geography

Trail is along State Highway 92 (MN 92).

Demographics

2010 census
As of the census of 2010, there were 46 people, 26 households, and 12 families living in the city. The racial makeup of the city was 100.0% White.

There were 26 households, of which 7.7% had children under the age of 18 living with them, 34.6% were married couples living together, 7.7% had a female householder with no husband present, 3.8% had a male householder with no wife present, and 53.8% were non-families. 46.2% of all households were made up of individuals, and 19.2% had someone living alone who was 65 years of age or older. The average household size was 1.77 and the average family size was 2.42.

The median age in the city was 52.5 years. 6.5% of residents were under the age of 18; 17.3% were between the ages of 18 and 24; 10.9% were from 25 to 44; 50% were from 45 to 64; and 15.2% were 65 years of age or older. The gender makeup of the city was 56.5% male and 43.5% female.

2000 census
As of the census of 2000, there were 62 people, 26 households, and 13 families living in the city. The racial makeup of the city was 95.16% White, 1.61% Native American, 1.61% from other races, and 1.61% from two or more races. Hispanic or Latino of any race were 1.61% of the population.

There were 26 households, out of which 30.8% had children under the age of 18 living with them, 30.8% were married couples living together, 11.5% had a female householder with no husband present, and 50.0% were non-families. 38.5% of all households were made up of individuals, and 19.2% had someone living alone who was 65 years of age or older. The average household size was 2.38 and the average family size was 3.23.

In the city, the population was spread out, with 30.6% under the age of 18, 6.5% from 18 to 24, 30.6% from 25 to 44, 21.0% from 45 to 64, and 11.3% who were 65 years of age or older. The median age was 36 years. For every 100 females, there were 158.3 males. For every 100 females age 18 and over, there were 152.9 males.

The median income for a household in the city was $30,000, and the median income for a family was $36,250. Males had a median income of $35,833 versus $33,750 for females. The per capita income for the city was $16,211. There were 20.0% of families and 22.2% of the population living below the poverty line, including no under eighteens and 22.2% of those over 64.

References

Cities in Polk County, Minnesota
Cities in Minnesota